Nena Kalu Ogba (born 3 January 1989 in Birnin Kebbi, Kebbi) is a Nigerian footballer, who last played for i-League side Churchill Brothers.

Career
Ogba Kalu was one of the leader Churchill Brothers S.C. in the I-League and was nominated as Fans Player of the Year 2010. In July 2010 signed for champions Dempo SC.
On 5 July 2017 Mohammeden SC signed Kalu.

Notes

1986 births
Living people
Nigerian footballers
Nigerian expatriate sportspeople in India
Churchill Brothers FC Goa players
Expatriate footballers in India
I-League players
Sporting Clube de Goa players
Dempo SC players
People from Kebbi State
Association football midfielders
Calcutta Football League players